Allen Ndodole (born 4 February 1996) is a Botswana football midfielder who currently plays for Orapa United.

References

1996 births
Living people
Botswana footballers
Nico United players
Mochudi Centre Chiefs SC players
Sharps Shooting Stars FC players
Orapa United F.C. players
Association football midfielders
Botswana international footballers